Triple Optix EP is an EP by rapper Diabolic, released in 2000. It was produced by Engineer, DJ Black Panther, Freshchest Prose & Diabolic. The EP indeed follows the same genre of subjects as his following projects have done such as political issues, Diabolic's life, etc.

Track listing

See also 

The Foul Play Mixtape
Liar & A Thief

References

http://www.hiphopug.com/diabolic.html
http://www.immortaltechnique.co.uk/Thread-Diabolic-Discography-FREE-Songs
http://www.viperrecords.com

2000 EPs
Diabolic (rapper) albums